Liston is a surname. Notable people with the surname include:

Carol Liston, Australian historian 
Ellen Liston  (1838–1885), Australian teacher and writer 
Emil Liston (1890–1949), American athletic coach and administrator
Eoin Liston (born 1957), Irish sportsperson
Henrietta Liston, British botanist
Henry Liston (1771–1836), Scottish minister and inventor
James Michael Liston (1881–1976), New Zealand Catholic bishop
J. J. Liston (1872–1944), Australian civic leader and sporting administrator
John Liston (c. 1776 – 1846), English comedian
Larry Liston (born 1952), American politician, Colorado House of Representatives
Melba Liston (1926–1999), American jazz musician
Robert Liston (1794–1847), Scottish surgeon
Robert Liston (diplomat) (1742–1836), British diplomat
Robert Liston (minister) (1730–1796), Scottish clergyman
Sonny Liston (Unknown–1970), American boxer
Tom Liston, American security analyst
Virginia Liston (1890–1932), American blues and jazz singer
William Glen Liston (1872–1950), British Army physician and medical entomologist

See also 
 Catherine Liston-Heyes (born ca 1966), Canadian economist

English-language surnames